Chanté Sherese Sandiford (born 8 January 1990) is a footballer who plays as a goalkeeper for Icelandic club Stjarnan and captains the Guyana national team.

Sandiford has played in the UEFA Women's Champions League with Russian club FC Zorky Krasnogorsk and Norwegian club Avaldsnes IL. Born in the United States, she has represented Guyana internationally.

Club career
Her collegiate career started at Villanova before her transfer to UCLA. A ruptured Achilles ended her collegiate career, but after 6 months of rehabilitation, she joined the New Jersey Wildcats.

After two seasons with Haukar, Sandiford signed with Úrvalsdeild kvenna club Stjarnan in early 2021.

International career
Sandiford has already appeared with Guyana.

Personal life
Sandiford is also a personal trainer, and launched an app for achieving fitness goals on a vegan diet.

See also
List of Guyana women's international footballers

References

External links

1990 births
Living people
African-American women's soccer players
American expatriate women's soccer players
American expatriate sportspeople in Russia
American expatriate sportspeople in Iceland
American expatriate sportspeople in Norway
American sportspeople of Guyanese descent
American women's soccer players
Avaldsnes IL players
Expatriate women's footballers in Iceland
Expatriate women's footballers in Norway
Expatriate women's footballers in Russia
FC Zorky Krasnogorsk (women) players
Guyanese expatriate footballers
Guyanese expatriates in Iceland
Guyanese expatriates in Norway
Guyanese expatriates in Russia
Guyanese women's footballers
Guyana women's international footballers
Chanté Sandiford
New Jersey Wildcats players
Pali Blues players
People from Bethpage, New York
People from Owings Mills, Maryland
Citizens of Guyana through descent
Chanté Sandiford
Soccer players from New York (state)
Soccer players from Maryland
Sportspeople from Baltimore County, Maryland
Sportspeople from Nassau County, New York
Chanté Sandiford
UCLA Bruins women's soccer players
Chanté Sandiford
Villanova Wildcats women's soccer players
Washington Freedom players
Women's association football goalkeepers
21st-century African-American sportspeople
21st-century African-American women